Prescott Speed Hill Climb is a hillclimb in Gloucestershire, England. The track was extended in 1960 to form the present Long Course.

History

Bugatti Owners' Club
The track is owned by the Bugatti Owners' Club (BOC), founded in 1929, who were looking for a permanent home and bought the land in 1937. The club had previously run events at Lewes and on the Chalfont Heights Estate, Chalfont St Peter, Buckinghamshire. The club also ran a one-off event at Joel Park, Northwood Hill, Middlesex, on 22 June 1935, which was won by Richard Ormonde Shuttleworth, on a Bugatti, in a time of 30.16 sec. The BOC planned to develop Dancer's End, near Tring, Hertfordshire, but an event there scheduled for 20 June 1936 had to be cancelled. Motor Sport reported in December 1937:"It will be recalled that about two years ago the Club planned to make Dancer's End a first-class hill-climb venue, and obtained approval from the landowner, Alan P. Good. Unfortunately, the noise nuisance, which is a disease not unknown to motor-race course promoters, broke out and the project was reluctantly abandoned,..."

1930s
The first event at Prescott was staged in April 1938, on what is now the Short Course. As announced in Motor Sport: "The Opening Rally on April 10th will comprise an assembly at Cheltenham for lunch, followed by a run to Prescott and possibly timed runs up the hill, followed by tea at the Prescott club-house. Prescott will be ready for the first official meeting on Sunday, May 15th." Unofficial fastest time in April was set by I. Craig in a 4.9-litre supercharged Bugatti in a time of 55.58 seconds.  Fastest time of the day at the inaugural meeting in May was set by Arthur Baron in a 2,270 c.c. supercharged Bugatti in a new record time of 50.70 seconds. Sydney Allard set the sports car record driving Hutchison's V12 Lincoln-engined Allard Special in a time of 54.35 seconds. On 3 July 1938 George Abecassis broke the Prescott outright record with a climb of 47.85 seconds in his supercharged 1½ litre Alta. Joe Fry bettered this unofficially when he climbed in 47.62 seconds in the 1,100 c.c. Freikaiserwagen, on 27 August 1938. Raymond Mays (2-litre E.R.A.) took the record on 30 July 1939 in a time of 46.14 seconds. Second overall at that meeting was Jean-Pierre Wimille in a 4.7-litre supercharged Bugatti, in the first international meeting held at Prescott.

There is a part of the course at Prescott named for Sydney Allard and known as Allard's Gap, sometimes shortened to Allard's. This resulted from an incident at the Bugatti Owners' Club meeting on 15 June 1947, when Sydney: "shot through the hedge at the semi-circle and landed well out in the field in the single-seater Allard.

Post War
Stirling Moss's first hillclimb was at Prescott on 9 May 1948, driving a Mk2 Cooper. He had hoped to enter at Shelsley Walsh somewhat earlier, but had been thwarted in this ambition as there were no spaces left in the entry list. On his actual debut at Prescott, Moss came fourth out of twelve, in the 500 c.c. class.

On 9 September 1951 at the Bugatti Owners' Club International Event Ken Wharton broke the track record in a time of 43.81 sec in a Cooper 1,000 c.c. Tony Marsh (Cooper) set a record at 43.32 sec in June 1956.

At the BOC meeting on 15 September 1963, Peter Westbury clinched the 1963 British Hill Climb Championship by taking second place to Peter Boshier-Jones (Lotus-Climax 1,220 c.c. supercharged) in the championship run-off. Westbury also took FTD in the class runs in a time of 48.95 secs in the Felday-Daimler.

In 1967 Motor reported: "Driving his V-8 engined Brabham, B. Eccles set up a new record for the hill of 47.31s. at the Bugatti Owners Club Invitation Prescott Hill climb on July 9."

Top Gear
An episode of Top Gear was filmed here, including a race between an Austin-Healey Sprite, which had most of its body panels removed, and a V6 Peugeot 306 with a number of cosmetic modifications and hydraulic suspension.

See also 
 Archie Butterworth

References

External links
Prescott Speed Hill Climb official website
Tom Rolt, "founder" of Prescott.

Top Gear – Hill climb challenge – BBC

Motorsport venues in England
Hillclimbs
Auto races in the United Kingdom
1938 in motorsport
Recurring sporting events established in 1938
1938 establishments in England